The War Emergency Programme destroyers were destroyers built for the British Royal Navy during World War I and World War II.

World War I emergency programmes
The 323 destroyers ordered during the First World War belonged to several different classes and were the subject of 14 separate War Programmes between 1914 and 1918. 40 of these were cancelled at the end of the war. The total excludes destroyers building in UK for other navies which were purchased for the Royal Navy following the outbreak of war.

World War II emergency programme
The 112 destroyers built during the Second World War were based on the hull and machinery of the earlier J-, K- and N-class destroyers of the 1930s. Each of the fourteen flotillas produced consisted of eight destroyers. Due to supply problems and the persistent failure by the Royal Navy to develop a suitable dual-purpose weapon for destroyers, they were fitted with whatever armament was available. Advances in radar and weaponry were incorporated as they came available. As a result, they were a relatively heterogeneous class incorporating many wartime advances, but ultimately based on a hull that was too small and with an armament too light to be true first-rate vessels equivalent of their contemporaries. As such they are often described as "utility" destroyers. Many vessels were transferred to friendly navies.

The 15th Emergency Flotilla, which would have had ships with names starting Ce was cancelled in favour of building the Weapon-class destroyers. The two ships, Centaur and Celt ,  being built became Tomahawk and Sword.

Design changes 
 The P, and 3 ships of the O, flotilla were fitted with 4-inch guns with a new design of tall gunshield. As a result, they carried only the Rangefinder-Director Mark II(W) for fire control.
 From the Q and R class onwards a transom stern was incorporated.
 From the Q and R class the main gun calibre returned to 4.7 inches.
 From the R flotilla onwards the officer's accommodation was forwards, instead of aft as was traditional Royal Navy practice
 The S flotilla altered the position of the searchlight between the torpedo tubes with the medium anti-aircraft position abaft the funnel. This more logical arrangement gave the anti-aircraft gun improved arcs of fire in the forward field.
 The S class introduced the new mounting CP Mark XXII for the 4.7-inch guns. This could readily be distinguished from the older mounting CP Mark XVIII of the O, Q and R by its sharply raked face, allowing increased elevation.
 S-class  incorporated the new 4.5-inch gun Mark III, in a prototype twin dual-purpose turret BD Mark IV forward and 4.5-inch gun Mark IV in single mountings CP Mark V aft. The former would be introduced in the Battle-class destroyer.
 The T flotilla introduced the lattice foremast, to support the ever-increasing weight of masthead electronics.
 The W flotilla introduced the dual-purpose Director Mark III(W), replacing the low-angle Destroyer DCT and High-Angle Rangefinder-Director Mark II(W) in use since the Q and R class.
 The Z flotilla introduced the new dual-purpose Director Mark I Type K and the 4.5-inch gun in single mountings CP Mark V as trialled in Savage. These mountings were based on the CP Mark XXII used in the later 4.7-inch gunned ships; there was no obvious difference.
 The Ch- flotilla introduced the dual-purpose Director Mark VI with full remote-power control (RPC) for gunlaying. One set of torpedo tubes was removed to counter the increased topweight.
 All ships used the Fuze Keeping Clock High Angle Fire Control Computer.

See also
Type 15 frigate: postwar full conversion of Wartime Emergency Programme destroyers into first-rate fast anti-submarine frigates
Type 16 frigate: postwar partial conversion of Wartime Emergency Programme destroyers into second-rate fast anti-submarine frigates

Notes

Bibliography

 

 

 

 

Destroyer classes